A Song Goes Round the World (German: Ein Lied geht um die Welt) is a 1933 German drama film directed by Richard Oswald and starring Joseph Schmidt, Viktor de Kowa and Charlotte Ander. It was shot at the Johannisthal Studios in Berlin with sets designed by the art director Franz Schroedter. An English-language version of the film was made My Song Goes Round the World by British International Pictures, also directed by Richard Oswald. The film serves as a semi-biopic of Joseph Schmidt, who appears in it himself. A 1958 film of the same name was also a biopic of Schmidt, who was by then dead.

Cast
 Joseph Schmidt as Ricardo
Viktor de Kowa as Rigo
Charlotte Ander as Nina
Fritz Kampers as Simoni
Carl de Vogt as Theaterdirektor
Carl Auen as Danto, Operndirektor
Edith Karin as Seine Sekretärin
Ida Perry as Wirtin

References

Bibliography
 Klaus, Ulrich J. Deutsche Tonfilme: Jahrgang 1933. Klaus-Archiv, 1988.

External links

1933 films
Films of the Weimar Republic
1930s German-language films
Films directed by Richard Oswald
1933 drama films
German multilingual films
Terra Film films
Films shot in Venice
German black-and-white films
German drama films
1933 multilingual films
1930s German films
Films shot at Johannisthal Studios